Established on July 12, 1930, the 1930 season was the inaugural season of the Portsmouth Spartans (now the Detroit Lions). The club was sponsored by the Green Bay Packers. In the team's first season, the Spartans tied for seventh in the league. The Spartans played their first game on September 14 beating the Newark Tornados 13–6. One notable game was on September 24 when the Spartans defeated the Brooklyn Dodgers at Universal Stadium. It was the first NFL night game played in front of portable lights.
	
The Spartans scored 176 points (12.6 points per game), which ranked 3rd out of 11 in the NFL. On the defense, the club allowed 161 points (an average of 11.5 points per game), 8th in the league.

Schedule

Standings

Roster

Awards and records

References

External links 
1930 Portsmouth Spartans at Pro Football Reference
1930 Portsmouth Spartans at jt-sw.com
1930 Portsmouth Spatans at The Football Database 

Portsmouth Spartans
Portsmouth Spartans
Detroit Lions seasons